Liberdade, Liberdade (English title: Lady Revolution; literal meaning: Freedom, Freedom) is a Brazilian telenovela produced and aired by TV Globo between 11 April and 4 August 2016, consisting of 67 episodes. It is the sixth telenovela in the 11 p.m. timeslot. It is based on Joaquina, Filha do Tiradentes, created by Maria José de Queiroz. The telenovela is developed by Mário Teixeira and directed by Vinícius Coimbra.

The telenovela features performances of Andreia Horta, Mateus Solano, Nathalia Dill, Bruno Ferrari, Dalton Vigh, Ricardo Pereira, Caio Blat, Sheron Menezzes, Rômulo Estrela, Maitê Proença and Lilia Cabral in the main roles.

Production 
Mariana Ximenes was initially cast for the role, Branca, but was chosen as protagonist in Haja Coração. Marjorie Estiano was also considered before Nathalia Dill was cast.

Filming of initial scenes took place in Diamantina and Minas Gerais that served as the fictitious Vila Rica.

Plot
Born in the 19th century, Joaquina (Mel Maia/Andreia Horta) is the daughter of revolutionary Tiradentes (Thiago Lacerda). A woman ahead of her time who carries in her blood the fight for freedom in Brazil.

As a child, she witnessed her father's death after he fought for people's freedom and was double-crossed by Rubião (Mateus Solano), his sword-arm. She was then taken to Portugal under the care of a revolution sympathizer who adopted her by the name of Rosa. Years later she comes back to Rio, a place of wrongdoing and slave abuse. A great anger at this situation awakens the will to fight she inherited from her father. There she meets Xavier (Bruno Ferrari), a rich Medical school student with a secret revolutionary side to him. Together they will find out they share not only the desire for freedom but a true love for one another.

Then Rubião crosses her path once again. Without knowing she Tiradentes' daughter, the villain will pursue her to marry him, making her life a living hell. But she will also make strong allies like Virgínia (Lília Cabral), a brothel owner who has always supported the revolution.

It is now in Joaquina's hands to end the war her father started. And she will not rest until freedom is written on the pages of history, even if it takes her own blood to do it.

Cast

Guest stars

Reception

Ratings 

On a consolidated basis, the debut of the plot registered 27.2 points, achieving the highest ratings for a premiere of the 11pm telenovela since Saramandaia (2013).

The finale, aired on 4 August, registered a viewership rating of 22.3 points. Cumulatively, the telenovela recorded an average rating of 18.5

References

External links 
 

2016 telenovelas
Brazilian telenovelas
2016 Brazilian television series debuts
2016 Brazilian television series endings
TV Globo telenovelas
Brazilian LGBT-related television shows
Portuguese-language telenovelas